Gadrooning is a decorative motif consisting of convex curves in a series. In furniture and other decorative arts, it is an ornamental carved band of tapered, curving and sometimes alternating concave and convex sections, usually diverging obliquely either side of a central point, often with rounded ends vaguely reminiscent of flower petals. Gadrooning, derived from Roman sarcophagi and other antiquities, was widely used during the Italian Renaissance, and in the classicising phases of 18th- and 19th-century design.

In medieval European metalwork, gadroons on circular dishes are often tapering, ending in a point on a central circular zone, and run diagonally across the surface in a spiral. Similar – but typically not tapered – designs were popular in Rococo porcelain and metalwork. In Renaissance or Neoclassical works, they are normally thinner and straighter.

The term may also be applied to spiralling stop-fluting running up a classical column.

Gadrooning is also observed on late 17th and 18th century glasses. It is produced with a second gather of glass leading a complex and ornate design due to the added layer of glass.  In some cases the gadrooning has a fringe which is drawn out to several points, leading to a flame-like appearance. This is known as flammiform (flamiform, alternative spelling) gadrooning.

Gallery

References

 BrownOwl's Antiques Glossary: Letter G. Retrieved 29 August 2007.

Decorative arts
Ornaments